is  the assistant coach of the Ryukyu Golden Kings in the Japanese B.League.

Head coaching record

|- 
| style="text-align:left;"|Miyazaki Shining Suns
| style="text-align:left;"|2010-11
| 50||13||37|||| style="text-align:center;"|8th in Western|||-||-||-||
| style="text-align:center;"|-
|- 
| style="text-align:left;"|Miyazaki Shining Suns
| style="text-align:left;"|2011-12
| 52||22||30|||| style="text-align:center;"|8th in Western|||-||-||-||
| style="text-align:center;"|-
|- 
| style="text-align:left;"|Ryukyu Golden Kings
| style="text-align:left;"|2012-13
| 52||42||10|||| style="text-align:center;"|1st in Western|||3||1||2||
| style="text-align:center;"|Lost in 2nd round
|- 
| style="text-align:left;"|Bambitious Nara
| style="text-align:left;"|2013-14
| 52||19||33|||| style="text-align:center;"|9th in Western|||-||-||-||
| style="text-align:center;"|-
|- 
| style="text-align:left;"|Shiga Lakestars
| style="text-align:left;"|2014-15
| 52||34||18|||| style="text-align:center;"|4th in Western|||7||5||2||
| style="text-align:center;"|3rd place
|- 
| style="text-align:left;"|Shiga Lakestars
| style="text-align:left;"|2015-16
| 52||35||17|||| style="text-align:center;"|5th in Western|||4||2||2||
| style="text-align:center;"|Lost in 2nd round
|- 
| style="text-align:left;"|Shiga Lakestars
| style="text-align:left;"|2016-17
| 60||21||39|||| style="text-align:center;"|6th in Western|||-||-||-||
| style="text-align:center;"|-
|-

References

1983 births
Living people
Bambitious Nara coaches
Japanese basketball coaches
Miyazaki Shining Suns coaches
Nagoya Diamond Dolphins coaches
Ryukyu Golden Kings coaches
San-en NeoPhoenix coaches
Shiga Lakes coaches